Kráľová pri Senci (meaning King Tree) is a village and municipality in western Slovakia in  Senec District in the Bratislava Region.

History
The village was first mentioned in 1363, it was royal property, hence probably the name. The most significant landmark of village is secession bridge over the river Čierna voda, which was built in 1904 and it imitates baroque architecture.

Geography
The village lies at an altitude of 128 metres and covers an area of 19.912 km². It has a population of 1426 people (as of 2004).

References

External links

Municipal website 
https://web.archive.org/web/20080111223415/http://www.statistics.sk/mosmis/eng/run.html 

Villages and municipalities in Senec District